Phyllosticta coryli is a plant pathogen infecting hazelnut.

References

External links
 USDA ARS Fungal Database

Fungal plant pathogens and diseases
Hazelnut tree diseases
coryli
Fungi described in 1872